The Libertarian Party of the United States was formed in Colorado Springs in the home of Luke Zell by a group of individuals led by David Nolan on December 11, 1971, after several months of debate among members of the Committee to Form a Libertarian Party, founded July 17. The formation was prompted in part by price controls and the end of the Gold Standard implemented by President Richard Nixon. The Libertarian Party viewed the dominant Republican and Democratic parties as having diverged from what they viewed as the libertarian principles of the American Founding Fathers. This group included John Hospers, Edward Crane, Manuel Klausner, Murray Rothbard, Roy Childs, D. Frank Robinson, Theodora (Tonie) Nathan, and Jim Dean.

Early history

A press conference announcing the new party was held on January 31, 1972, at the party's headquarters in Westminster, Colorado. The first national convention, attracting 89 delegates from 23 states, was held that June in Denver, Colorado. According to Ron Crickenberger, former Political Director of the LP, a search of LP records showed that the LP had elected Miguel Gilson-De Lemos in a partisan local board race in New York even before the adoption of its first platform. Several others were also elected or appointed that year. Party leaders initially doubted they would even see six people elected or appointed by 2001, so this led to early optimism among some. However, in subsequent years the number of people in office seemed to be about 1% of its donor base: approximately 30 officeholders with 3,000 donors in 1981; 100 in office and 10,000 donors in 1991; and 600 and 60,000 in 2001.

In 1971, seventy-five percent of members supported running a presidential ticket and sixty percent supported running candidates for lower offices. Members of the party supported giving its presidential nomination to Murray Rothbard, Alan Greenspan, Vivien Kellems, A. Ernest Fitzgerald, Martin Anderson, Phil Crane, Robert A. Heinlein, H. R. Gross, Milton Friedman, Sam Ervin, Henry Manne, or Karl Hess. The party's name was selected by a vote of 111 to 87 in favor. John Hospers won the presidential nomination for the 1972 presidential election against James Bryan and Tonie Nathan defeated Diana Amsden for the vice-presidential nomination.

By the 1972 presidential election, the party had grown to over 80 members and had attained ballot access in two states. Their presidential ticket received between 3,000 and 4,000 votes, but received the first and only electoral college vote for a Libertarian presidential ticket, from Roger MacBride of Virginia, who was pledged to Richard Nixon. His was also the first vote ever cast for a woman in the United States Electoral College. MacBride became the party's presidential nominee in the 1976 presidential election. The 1976 election established the Libertarian Party as the number 1 alternative political party in the United States, and it remains the most successful alternative political party since the end of the Second World War.

In 1978, Dick Randolph became the first Libertarian to win state-level office with his election to the Alaska House of Representatives. Two years later, he won another term and Ken Fanning was also elected as a Libertarian to that chamber.

Clark, Crane, Koch, and Paul
In the 1980 presidential contest, the Libertarian Party gained ballot access in all 50 states, Washington, D.C., and Guam, the first time a third party accomplished this since the Socialist Party in 1916 (when there were only 48 states and the District of Columbia did not get to vote for president). The ticket of Ed Clark and David H. Koch spent several million dollars on this political campaign and earned more than one percent of the popular vote with almost one million votes.

The party ran more candidates for seats in the United States House of Representatives than any other minor party since the 1980 elections.

On December 29, 1981, the first widely reported successful election in the continental United States of a Libertarian Party candidate in a partisan race occurred as Richard P. Siano, a Boeing 707 pilot for Trans World Airlines, running against both a Republican and a Democrat, was elected to the office of Kingwood Township Committeeman in western Hunterdon County, New Jersey. His election resulted from the special election held on December 29, 1981, to break a tie vote in the general election between him and the Democratic candidate. He received 63% of the votes cast in the special election. He served a three-year term of office. Another Libertarian had, in 1977, been elected to a city council position in New Jersey.

In 1984, the party's presidential nominee, David Bergland, gained access to the ballot in 36 states and earned one-quarter of one percent of the popular vote. In 1987, Doug Anderson became the first Libertarian elected to office in a major city, elected to the Denver Election Commission (later, in 2005, Anderson was elected to the Lakewood, Colorado city council).

In 1988, former Republican Congressman Ron Paul won the Libertarian nomination for president and was on the ballot in 46 states. Paul later successfully ran for United States House of Representatives from Texas, once again as a Republican, and held that office until 2013. He ran in the Republican primaries in 2008 and sponsored HR 1207 in the House of Representatives, a bill to audit the Federal Reserve. His running mate was Andre Marrou, a former member of the Alaska legislature; the ticket was thus one of the few "third-party" tickets in American history to have former office-holders in both slots.

From Marrou to Browne
In 1992, Andre Marrou, a Libertarian elected to the Alaska state legislature and Ron Paul's running mate in 1988, led the ticket, with attorney Nancy Lord as his vice presidential (VP) running mate. For the first time since the Clark campaign in 1980, the Libertarian Party's presidential ticket made the ballot in all 50 states, DC, and Guam usually as independent candidates without party labelling. In 1994, radio personality Howard Stern embarked on a political campaign for Governor of New York, formally announcing his candidacy under the Libertarian Party ticket. Although he legally qualified for the office and campaigned for a time after his nomination, many viewed the run for office as nothing more than a publicity stunt. He subsequently withdrew his candidacy because he did not want to comply with the financial disclosure requirements for candidates.

Investment adviser Harry Browne headed the 1996 and 2000 presidential tickets. The VP candidate in 1996 was South Carolina entrepreneur Jo Jorgensen; in 2000, Art Olivier of California was Browne's running mate. In 1996 the Party's presidential candidate again made the ballot in all 50 states, often as an independent without Libertarian labelling Washington, D.C. and Guam. The party's presidential ticket again made the ballot in 49 states, D.C. and Guam in 2000, mostly without party labelling. Although the LP has had ballot access with party labelling in some states for an election or for a time, the LP has never had ballot access with party labelling in all fifty states.

Election cycles in the 2000s
In all of these cases, the party's presidential nominee drew in between one third and one half of one percent of the popular vote. In 2000, the Arizona Libertarian Party, which had been disaffiliated from the national organization in late 1999, but which controlled the Libertarian ballot line in that state, nominated science fiction author L. Neil Smith and newspaperman Vin Suprynowicz, rather than Browne and Olivier, as its presidential slate. Smith and Suprynowicz polled 5,775 votes (0.4%) in Arizona.

2004–2007
In the 2004 election cycle, the Libertarian Party's presidential nomination race was the closest to date. Three candidatesgun-rights activist and software engineer Michael Badnarik, talk radio host Gary Nolan, and Hollywood producer Aaron Russocame within two percent of each other on the first two ballots at the 2004 national convention in Atlanta. Badnarik was chosen as the party's presidential nominee on the third ballot after Nolan was eliminated, a comeback many saw as surprising, as Badnarik had not been viewed as a front-runner for the nominationmany delegates were won over during the convention itself, due to Badnarik's perceived strong performance in a formal candidate debate. The Badnarik campaign secured ballot status in 48 states (plus D.C. and Guam) and earned 397,265 votes. Despite less name recognition and a much smaller campaign checkbook, Badnarik polled nearly as well as independent candidate Ralph Nader. The Libertarian party also garnered more votes than the Green Party that year. His running mate was Richard Campagna who secured the vice presidential nod at the party's Atlanta convention with a landslide victory.

In the November 2006 mid-term election, the median vote percentage for Libertarians who ran for US House (excluding races with only one major party nominee) was 2.0%; while the median percentage for Greens who ran for that office (again excluding races with only one major party nominee) was 1.4%. Over 13,400,000 votes were cast for Libertarian Party candidates in 2006. In the 2007 general elections, Libertarian Party candidates won 14 elective offices, including an election for mayor of Avis, Pennsylvania.

2008
Several candidates sought to become the party's 2008 presidential nominee. Ron Paul, who had been the party's 1988 nominee and was seeking the 2008 Presidential nomination of the Republican Party, was mentioned as a possible nominee as well, but he officially denied any intent to run under a third-party banner. On December 12, 2007, the Party adopted a resolution requesting Paul to run on the Libertarian ticket if he did not win the Republican Party nomination.
On March 25, 2008, Mike Gravel changed from the Democratic Party to the Libertarian Party. On May 12, 2008, ten days before the 2008 Libertarian National Convention, Bob Barr, a former employee for then CIA Director George W. Bush and later a Republican U.S. Congressman, announced that he would seek the nomination.

At the time of the 2008 Libertarian National Convention there were eight candidates for consideration at the convention: Bob Barr, Mike Gravel, Mike Jingozian, Steve Kubby, George Phillies, Wayne Allyn Root, Mary Ruwart, and Christine Smith. On May 25, after six ballots, the Libertarian Party chose Barr as their official nominee for president, and Root as his running mate.

2009–2012, Tea Party protests

Protests caused by the Great Recession and the Affordable Care Act resulted in gains for both the Libertarian and Republican parties in the 2010 midterm elections. Calling themselves the Tea Party movement (based on the original Boston Tea Party), protesters desired a return to the government's constitutional limits, cuts in government spending and taxes, a Balanced Budget Amendment, and other economic policy reforms supported by the Libertarian Party. Though the Republicans successfully absorbed many voters from these protests as well, they would later lose popularity as the Libertarians continued to benefit into the 2012 elections and held on to much of the support they had lost in the mid-2000s.

2012 Gary Johnson campaign

After initially running for the Republican nomination, former Governor of New Mexico Gary Johnson announced his intention to seek that of the Libertarians. Johnson is known for his opposition to United States involvement in the Afghanistan, Iraq and Libyan wars and as a fiscal conservative who supports "slashing government spending". As governor, he cut taxes fourteen times and slashed the 10% annual growth in the New Mexican budget using his gubernatorial veto. He won the nomination over Virginian Bill Still and Texan R. Lee Wrights. He came in third in the general election, receiving 1,275,821 popular votes (1.0%), the most votes of any Libertarian Party presidential candidate.

2016 Gary Johnson campaign 

At the Libertarian Party National Convention held in Orlando, Florida, on May 26–30, 2016, former Governor of New Mexico Gary Johnson became the Libertarian Party candidate for president. His running mate was former Governor of Massachusetts Bill Weld. They were on the ballot in all 50 states, including D.C.

Presidential tickets

References

Libertarian Party (United States)
Libertarian Party (United States)
Political history of the United States
Libertarian Party